Marshall Williams (born July 31, 1989) is a Canadian actor and model. He is best known for his role as Spencer Porter on Glee, and Albert Banks in How to Build a Better Boy.

Life and career
Marshall Williams was born in Winnipeg, Manitoba. Williams was a contestant on Canadian Idol in 2007 and 2008. As a model, he has worked with Abercrombie & Fitch, Hollister, Diesel, Mattel, and M.A.C. Cosmetics, in addition to walking the runway in both Toronto Fashion Week and Los Angeles Fashion Week. In his latest TV movie, Williams stars in the Disney Channel Original Movie, How to Build a Better Boy, as Albert Banks. Williams also starred in the sixth and final season of Glee,  in which he played Spencer Porter, a member of the McKinley High School football team who joins the glee club.

Filmography

References

External links

1989 births
Living people
21st-century Canadian male actors
Canadian male child actors
Canadian male film actors
Canadian male models
Canadian male television actors
Male actors from Winnipeg